Thomas William Miller (born 8 January 1979) is an English professional footballer who played as a midfielder. He was most recently the manager of National League North club Spennymoor Town.

He has previously played for Hartlepool United, Ipswich Town, Sunderland, Preston North End, Sheffield Wednesday, Huddersfield Town, Swindon Town, Bury and FC Halifax Town.

Playing career

Hartlepool United
Born in County Durham, Tommy was in the Ipswich Town youth system as a youngster but was released at 15 and went on to join Hartlepool United, where he signed his first professional deal. After 160 appearances and 41 goals in Division Three, he attracted the interest of several clubs and so left the club in 2001. Before joining Ipswich Town, Miller was close to joining Norwegian side Brann in order to play in the Champions League Campaign on a three-month loan deal. However, Miller's move to Brann was unlikely because FA rules state a player can only join a team outside of Britain for a minimum of three months.

Ipswich Town
Miller signed back to Ipswich on 12 July 2001 by manager George Burley for £750,000. In his first season at Ipswich Town, he only made eight league appearances and his side was 18th place which resulted relegation to Football League Division One. On 1 November 2001, he made his European cup debut in the UEFA Cup against Swedish side Helsingborgs in a 3–1 win. On 25 November 2001, Miller made his league debut for the club in 0–0 draw against Middlesbrough after coming on as a substitute on a 75 minutes for Sixto Peralta. The following season, the club did play in the UEFA Cup again due to UEFA Respect Fair Play ranking where Miller was involved in the First Round against Smederevo and won 2–1 on aggregate.

He then spent four years at Ipswich, scoring 15 goals in 50 appearances in the 2004–05 season and helping them to an unsuccessful Championship play-off appearance. After his last season, Ipswich Town offered Miller a new contract on a two years, only for him to rejected as his contract was set to expire which attracted interests from Premier League and Championship clubs.

Sunderland
Miller moved to Sunderland in June 2005 on a two-year contract, beating Scottish club Celtic and Leeds United who were chasing after him. On 13 August 2005, he made his debut for the club in a 3–1 loss against Charlton Athletic. On 25 September 2005, he scored his first goal in the Premier League and for Sunderland in a 2–0 win over Middlesbrough, giving their first win in the Premier League since 2002. The next game on 1 October 2005, Miller scored his second goal in a 1–1 draw against West Ham United. It took seven months for Miller to score in a 2–1 loss against Portsmouth on 22 April 2006. However he struggled as they returned to the Championship after just one season, finishing bottom with a record low of 15 points. In his first season, Miller played 29 games in the Premier League and played in the midfield position.

He started the first three games of the season under new manager Niall Quinn, but after the appointment of Roy Keane he found himself sidelined and in the pecking order which led him being loaned to Preston North End. On 28 November 2006, Miller made his debut for the club in a 1–1 draw against Coventry City. On 30 December 2006, Miller played against his parents club in a 1–0 win despite being on loan. On 10 March 2007, Miller made his last appearance for club in a 2–0 win over Barnsley. He was released at the end of the 2006–07 season as Sunderland were promoted to the Premier League again after one season at the Championship.

Return to Ipswich Town
After being released, Miller was linked to Championship sides Stoke, Coventry and Sheffield Wednesday, League One sides Nottingham Forest and Leeds United, and also SPL side Hearts. Also interested was Romanian side Steaua București who want to sign him with reports claiming that he could discuss a move. However, Miller snub moving to Steaua București in order to stay in England.

On 19 July 2007, Miller started his third spell with Ipswich Town, signing a two-year contract with the Championship club. Ipswich Town were linked signing him last November 2006 on loan but opted to join Preston. On 11 August 2007, Miller made his second debut for the club in a 4–1 win over Sheffield Wednesday. At the start of the 2007–08 season he failed to score many goals but towards the end of the season he scored three in the last six and finished his goal tally for the season on five.

Miller was released by Ipswich on 8 May 2009 along with seven players.

Sheffield Wednesday
Upon completing the signing of Miller for Sheffield Wednesday manager Brian Laws commented, "I have made it clear that we need to add experience to our squad and Tommy certainly fits the bill. He also has the ability to go with that experience and a massive drive to succeed. I am delighted to welcome him to the club". Miller signed a two-year contract. Previously in December 2001, Sheffield Wednesday made an approach for Miller but rejected by Ispwich Town as Manager Joe Royle wanted to keep Miller. On 15 August 2009, Miller made his debut for the club in a 1–1 draw against Peterborough United. He scored his first goal in a 2–2 draw at Deepdale against Preston North End. Later on the season, Brian Laws left the club after being sacked and went on to take up a Burnley in the Premier League and was succeeded by Alan Irvine. Also, Sheffield Wednesday was relegated on the final game of the season after drawing 2–2 with Crystal Palace.

At the beginning of the 2010–11 season, Miller changed his squad number from 6 to 8. He was named PFA Fans' Player of the Month in League One for October 2010, pipping teammate Nicky Weaver to the award.

On 10 May 2011, Sheffield Wednesday released Miller from his contract. After his release, Miller hit back on Irvine successor Gary Megson for forcing him out of the club and claims that Megson made Miller a promise for a new contract but Megson changed his mind.

Huddersfield Town
Miller signed a one-year deal with Huddersfield Town on 7 July. Before joining Huddersfield Town, Miller was linked to join Conference National side Gateshead. He made his Terriers debut as a substitute in the 1–1 draw against Bury at the Galpharm Stadium on 6 August 2011.

He scored his first goal for the Terriers in their 2–2 Football League Trophy draw against Bradford City at the Galpharm on 11 October 2011, though he would later miss a penalty in the shootout. His first league goal came in their 2–2 draw against Scunthorpe United at Glanford Park on 25 October 2011.

He left the club in June 2012, after not being offered a new contract by the manager, Simon Grayson.

Swindon Town
On 21 June 2012, Miller was announced as Swindon Town and Manager Paolo Di Canio's latest signing. Miller joined the club on a free transfer penning a one-year deal. He adds significant experience to the squad and joined former Terriers teammate Gary Roberts who signed a few days earlier at The County Ground. . Among the clubs interested in signing Miller, was his former club Hartlepool United and had talks with him since his release. He scored his first goal for Swindon on 21 August 2012 against Crawley Town at the County Ground.

On 20 February, following the departure of Paolo Di Canio, Swindon announced that along with Darren Ward, Miller would be taking temporary charge of the squad for the game against Preston on 23 February.

Bury
On 19 August 2013, Miller joined Bury, with Kevin Blackwell saying "Tommy brings a wealth of experience that is needed at this level. He is excellent on the ball and is one of the key players I have been trying to bring to the Club. He had offers at higher levels but he was very impressed with the new set up here at Gigg Lane. He will be a great asset to the Club."

Miller left Bury at the end of the 2013–14 season when his contract expired.

Return to Hartlepool
At the end of the 2013–14 season, Miller left Bury to join Hartlepool United under the guide of Colin Cooper. He injured his calf in October 2014 only making one more appearance which was on 28 April 2015, in the 2–1 win against Exeter City which confirmed Hartlepool's Football League status. It was also his 600th career appearance.

Coaching career
After acting as caretaker manager following the departure of Jason Ainsley, Miller was announced as the permanent manager of National League North side Spennymoor Town. Miller was sacked on 5 December 2021 after just seven months in charge, the club sitting 13th in the table.

International recognition
Miller was eligible for England and Scotland. After his good form in 2004–05 he was noticed by Scotland manager Berti Vogts, but was unavailable due to injury. This led Miller to hint that he hoped to get a Scottish call up. Miller was named in a friendly squad to face Wales in 2004, but missed out due to an ankle injury.

Career statistics

Honours
Huddersfield Town
Football League One play-offs: 2012

Individual
PFA Team of the Year: 1999–2000 Third Division, 2000–01 Third Division
PFA Fans' League One Player of the Month: October 2010

References

External links
 
Tommy Miller at spennymoortownfc.co.uk

1979 births
Living people
Anglo-Scots
English people of Scottish descent
Association football midfielders
English footballers
Hartlepool United F.C. players
Ipswich Town F.C. players
Preston North End F.C. players
Sunderland A.F.C. players
Sheffield Wednesday F.C. players
Huddersfield Town A.F.C. players
Swindon Town F.C. players
Bury F.C. players
FC Halifax Town players
English Football League players
Premier League players
Swindon Town F.C. managers
Spennymoor Town F.C. managers
English football managers